Rentachintala is a village in Palnadu district of the Indian state of Andhra Pradesh. It is located in Rentachintala mandal of Gurazala revenue division.

Etymology 
The name Rentachintala or Reattachment is said to have originated from Rendu Chintalu, Rendu meaning the numeric 2 and Chintalu meaning tamarind in Telugu language. The village is said to be established between two tamarind trees after which the name of the village is coined.along with other different religious festivals there will be a carnival celebrated every year on 2nd of February by RCM church.irrespective of cast religion group every one from surrounding villages will participate in this carnival.  
this village is also famous for its temperature which goes up to 50 degrees during mid summer. flooring marbles of different colours with different varieties or available.it is  also famous for red chilli.

Geography and climate 

Rentachintala has a tropical wet and dry climate. The highest temperatures are experienced in the month of May, when the summer season is at its peak. The maximum temperature averages more than 40 degrees, occasionally reaching as high as 45 degrees. The highest temperature ever recorded is 48 degrees Celsius in 2012. Winters are pleasant, with occasional spells of rain from the northwest monsoon.

Demographics 
 Census of India, Rentachintala has a total population of 16,523. Males constitute 51% and females constitute 49% of the population. The literacy rate in Retachintala is 55.46%, lower than the national average of 74.04%. Male literacy is at 63.33% and female literacy is at 47.27%. Less than 1% of the population at Rentachintala is below 6 years of age.

Government and politics 

Rentachintala gram panchayat is the local self-government of the village. It is divided into wards and each ward is represented by a ward member. The ward members are headed by a Sarpanch.

In popular media and films 
The village of Rentachintala is featured in Tollywood movie, Mirchi.

References 

Villages in Palnadu district